Putnam Township is one of twenty townships in Fayette County, Iowa, USA.  As of the 2010 census, its population was 313.

Geography
According to the United States Census Bureau, Putnam Township covers an area of 36.56 square miles (94.69 square kilometers); of this, 36.54 square miles (94.63 square kilometers, 99.94 percent) is land and 0.02 square miles (0.06 square kilometers, 0.06 percent) is water.

Unincorporated towns
 Maryville at 
(This list is based on USGS data and may include former settlements.)

Adjacent townships
 Fairfield Township (north)
 Sperry Township, Clayton County (northeast)
 Cass Township, Clayton County (east)
 Richland Township, Delaware County (southeast)
 Madison Township, Buchanan County (south)
 Buffalo Township, Buchanan County (southwest)
 Scott Township (west)
 Smithfield Township (northwest)

Cemeteries
The township contains Union Cemetery.

Major highways
  Iowa Highway 3
  Iowa Highway 187

School districts
 Oelwein Community School District
 Starmont Community School District

Political districts
 Iowa's 1st congressional district
 State House District 24
 State Senate District 12

References
 United States Census Bureau 2008 TIGER/Line Shapefiles
 United States Board on Geographic Names (GNIS)
 United States National Atlas

External links
 US-Counties.com
 City-Data.com

Townships in Fayette County, Iowa
Townships in Iowa